Philomena is a 2013 British comedy-drama film directed by Stephen Frears. Steve Coogan and Jeff Pope adapted the screenplay from The Lost Child of Philomena Lee by Martin Sixsmith. The film focuses on Philomena Lee's (Judi Dench) 50-year-long search for the son she was forced to give up for adoption. It was screened in the main competition section at the 70th Venice International Film Festival, where it competed for the Golden Lion. Philomena was released in the United Kingdom by The Weinstein Company on 1 November 2013. As of March 2014, the film has earned over £86 million in its combined total gross at the box office.

The film gathered various awards and nominations following its release, ranging from recognition of the film itself to Coogan and Pope's screenplay, and Dench's acting performance. Philomena earned four nominations from the 86th Academy Awards and the 67th British Academy Film Awards respectively. Dench was nominated for two awards from the Alliance of Women Film Journalists, while Coogan and Pope received a nomination for Best Adapted Screenplay. Philomena received four nominations from the British Independent Film Awards, with Coogan and Dench nominated in the Best Actor and Best Actress categories. Consolata Boyle received a nomination for Excellence in Contemporary Film from the Costume Designers Guild for her work on the film. Dench gathered further Best Actress nominations from the Broadcast Film Critics Association, Dallas–Fort Worth Film Critics Association and Florida Film Critics Circle.

At the 71st Golden Globe Awards, Philomena was nominated in the Best Drama Motion Picture category, while Dench was nominated for Best Actress and Coogan and Pope nominated for Best Screenplay. Frears collected the Best Narrative Feature award at the Hamptons International Film Festival. The film has been nominated for five London Film Critics' Circle awards and four Satellite Awards, including Best Film and Best Original Score for Alexandre Desplat. As well as being nominated for the Golden Lion, Philomena collected nine awards at the Venice Film Festival ranging from Best Screenplay to the Queer Lion and the SIGNIS Award. At the Toronto and Virginia Film Festivals, Philomena won the People's Choice Award First Runner Up and Best Narrative Feature respectively. The film's screenplay is nominated for the USC Scripter Award, while the Women Film Critics Circle awarded the picture three accolades including Best Female Images in a Movie.

Awards and nominations

References

External links
 

Lists of accolades by film